Abbas Mohammadrezaei (born 9 September 1982) is an Iranian footballer who plays for Khooneh be Khooneh in the Azadegan League.

Club career
Rezaei joined Saipa in 2010, after spending the previous season at Saba Qom.

 Assists

Honours
Esteghlal
Iran Pro League (1): 2012–13

Foolad
Iran Pro League (1): 2013–14

References

External links
Abbas Mohammadrezaei at Footballdatabase

1982 births
Living people
Iranian footballers
Saipa F.C. players
Saba players
Fajr Sepasi players
Esteghlal F.C. players
Shahr Khodro F.C. players
Foolad FC players
Association football midfielders